Damnjanović (literally "son of Damnjan") is a Serbian surname, predominantly born by ethnic Serbs.

It may refer to:
Milan Damnjanović (1924–1994), Serbian philosopher, full professor at the Serbian Faculty of Fine Arts.
Radomir Damnjanović Damnjan (born 1935), Serbian painter and conceptual artist living and working in Milan and Belgrade.
Milan Damnjanović (born 1953), full professor specialising in Quantum mechanics and Mathematical physics at the Faculty of Physics at the University of Belgrade and Corresponding Member of Serbian Academy of Sciences and Arts.
Sanja Damnjanović (born 1987), Serbian handballer who plays for the Croatian club RK Podravka Koprivnica and the Serbian national team.
Jovana Damnjanović (born 1994), Serbian women's footballer who plays for Serbia national football team.

See also
Damjanović
Damjanić
Damijanić

Serbian surnames
Patronymic surnames